Krishna Chandra Santra is an Indian academic and politician from West Bengal belonging to All India Trinamool Congress. He is a member of the West Bengal Legislative Assembly.

He graduated from University of Burdwan in 1974. He was elected as a member of the West Bengal Legislative Assembly from  Arambag in 2011 and 2016.

References

Living people
21st-century Bengalis
Bengali Hindus
Trinamool Congress politicians from West Bengal
West Bengal MLAs 2011–2016
West Bengal MLAs 2016–2021
University of Burdwan alumni
People from Hooghly district
Year of birth missing (living people)
West Bengal politicians